Walter Bradley may refer to:

 Walter Bradley (engineer) (born 1943), American engineering professor, author, and advocate of the concept of intelligent design
 Walter Dwight Bradley (born 1946), Lieutenant Governor of New Mexico
 Walter Lyle Bradley (born 1943), Canadian ice hockey centre
 Bill Bradley (cricketer) (Walter Morris Bradley, 1875–1944), English cricketer
 Walter Bradley (Australian politician) (1836–1893), Australian member of parliament for East Sydney
 Walter Bradley (Canadian politician) (born 1945), Canadian politician in the Legislative Assembly of Prince Edward Island